Coleophora varnella is a moth of the family Coleophoridae. It is found in eastern Bulgaria.

The wingspan is 17–18 mm. Adults have been recorded in June.

The larvae possibly feed on Centaurea species.

Etymology
The specific name refers to the town of Varna, situated close to the type locality.

References

varnella
Moths of Asia
Moths described in 2008